William Gascoigne may refer to:

Sir William Gascoigne (c. 1350–1419), Chief Justice of England
William Gascoigne (MP for Yorkshire), in 1421 MP for Yorkshire
William Gascoigne (MP died 1423), MP for Bridgwater
Sir William Gascoigne (died 1540), MP for Bedfordshire
William Gascoigne (scientist) (1612–1644), English scientific instrument maker
Sir William Julius Gascoigne (1844–1926), British Army general